The Whitney Farm is a historic farm property at 215 Whitneyville Road in Appleton, Maine. The property was listed on the National Register of Historic Places in 2015.

Description and history
The Whitney Farm property is located in eastern Appleton and western Searsmont, a rural inland area of Mid Coast Maine.  The farmstead is located in Appleton, about  downslope on the north side of Appleton Ridge.  The farm property consists of a series of fields and woodlots, and is partly divided by Whitney Bog, which straddles the town line.  The farmstead is a closely grouped collection of buildings at the northeastern end of Whitneyville Road, the access road to the property from Appleton Ridge Road.  The main house is a c. 1825 Cape style wood frame building, with its exterior clad in a combination of clapboards and wooden shingles.  Brick chimneys rise at the center of the main block, and in one of two single-story gabled ells that project from it.  North of the house stands the barn, dating to the first half of the 19th century, from which a single-story series of garage bays projects southward.  A second outbuilding was called the cooper shop by members of the Whitney family; it has two sections, one dating to c. 1900, and the other of older but uncertain age.  This building also saw historical use as a chicken coop.  Also to the east of the house is a long and rectangular poultry house.  Two distinctive surviving outbuildings are a corn crib and ice house, both relatively unusual survivors in rural Maine.

This farm property was first settled about 1825 by John Tole, and was basically a subsistence farm in its early years.  It remained as a diversified farm, growing in size with the success of several owners in the second half of the 19th century, and was purchased in 1878 by Martha and Hezekiah Whitney, whose descendants would own the property into the 21st century.  Burton Whitney, of the second generation, was predominantly a cooper, producing barrels for potato farming businesses of Aroostook County, but specialized the farm into poultry.

See also
National Register of Historic Places listings in Knox County, Maine
National Register of Historic Places listings in Waldo County, Maine

References

Historic districts on the National Register of Historic Places in Maine
Farms on the National Register of Historic Places in Maine
Federal architecture in Maine
Houses completed in 1825
Houses in Knox County, Maine
National Register of Historic Places in Knox County, Maine
Houses in Waldo County, Maine
National Register of Historic Places in Waldo County, Maine